The California interior chaparral and woodlands ecoregion covers  in an elliptical ring around the California Central Valley. It is part of the Mediterranean forests, woodlands, and scrub biome, with cool, wet winters and hot, dry summers. Temperatures within the coast can range from 53° to 65 °F and 32° to 60 °F within the mountains. Many plant and animal species in this ecoregion are adapted to periodic fire.

Geography
The California interior chaparral and woodlands ecoregion extends from as far north as Shasta Lake in Northern California to as far south as the Santa Barbara Channel in Southern California.

Despite being termed as "inland", this ecoregion features extensive coastline between the Central Coast towns of Goleta and San Simeon, as well as within the Monterey and San Francisco Bay areas. These coastal regions are broken up by isolated patches of Northern California coastal forests and California montane chaparral and woodlands, which inhabit the higher elevation Santa Cruz and Santa Lucia Mountains, respectively. At its peak, the chaparral and woodlands rise up to 5,000 feet above sea level.

Major urban centers located within this ecoregion include Santa Maria, San Luis Obispo, Salinas, Santa Cruz, San José, San Francisco, Oakland, Santa Rosa, Redding, and Oroville.

Flora
These woodlands are varied and rich in plant life. The ecoregion contains areas of grass, chaparral shrublands, savanna dotted with oak, oak woodlands, serpentine soil communities, closed-cone pine forest with small patches of mountain conifers, wetland, marsh, salt marshes, and riverside forest.

Chaparral and oak woodlands are the most widespread plant communities in this ecoregion. The chaparral is composed of diverse shrubs and herbs. These include chamise and several species of manzanita and ceanothus.  Gray pine often emerges from the shrubs. Meanwhile, buckeye is extensive and Blue oak is one of the most extensive of the many varieties of oak in the woodlands: scrub oak, coast live oak, canyon live oak, valley oak, and interior live oak. This kind of vegetation relies on the incessant fires for germination as it clears the land and allows for shrubby growth.

The pine and cypress communities on the areas of serpentine soil within this ecoregion harbor many endemic species such as milkwort jewelflower. The main trees of this habitat are Sargent cypress and MacNab cypress with California scrub oak.

Shrubby and herbaceous plants including many endemic species inhabit this ecoregion, and it is estimated there are 2036 species of them.

Fauna
Over seventy species of mammals occur in this rich ecoregion. The endemic mammals include three species of kangaroo rat - the giant kangaroo rat (Dipodomys ingens), Heermann's kangaroo rat (Dipodomys heermani), and narrow-faced kangaroo rat (Dipodomys venustus). The salt marsh harvest mouse (Reithrodontomys raviventris) is also included, which is the most populated endemic mammal species in U.S. and Canadian habitats. Some hundred species of birds occur here. Indicator species are scrub jays, acorn woodpeckers, and wrentits. Unusual invertebrate species, such as army ants (Neivamyrmex spp.), primitive bristletails, and land snails, also exist here.

Threats and preservation

About one third of the original habitat remains, especially at higher elevations. Adapted to periodic fires, many species and communities in the ecoregion are highly fire resilient, and there are many species which regenerate by fires. The trees of Closed-cone pine forest burned in every 25–50 years, and a few species including the knobcone pine (Pinus attenuata) are adapted to open the cones and release seeds for new growth following the heat of forest fires. However, as fire regulation and suppression becomes more effective these communities cannot renew themselves.

Although the chaparral is widely considered "fire-dependent," this is a misconception. Varying factors including the species present, angle and direction of the slope on which the chaparral grows, and local climate conditions affect how well the environment is able to respond to fire, along with the frequency, intensity, and seasonality of the fire. One common factor among chaparral, however, is that a minimum of 10 years is needed between fires for the chaparral to mature and set enough seed in the soil to create a fire resilient environment. As human activity increases the frequency of fires, the chaparral's ability to renew itself decreases, leading to elimination and degradation. Moreover, non-native grasses will invade burned areas, making it increasingly difficult for healthy chaparral to grow.

A new leadership intent to protect chaparral has been established by the United States Forest Service to combat the increased rate of fires in the chaparral. California state policy has also recognized the need to protect the chaparral vegetation threatened by the fires.

Other threats to the ecoregion include development, overgrazing, conversion to annual grasses, and invasive species. Invasive grasses often appear as the result of fires or human development in chaparral.

Protected areas of the ecoregion include: American River Parkway, Berryessa Snow Mountain National Monument, Point Reyes National Seashore, Mount Tamalpais State Park, Mount Diablo State Park, Henry W. Coe State Park, Pinnacles National Park, Folsom Lake State Recreation Area  and Carrizo Plain National Monument.

See also
List of ecoregions in the United States (WWF)

References

External links

Photos tagged with "California interior chaparral and woodlands" on flickr

California chaparral and woodlands
Plant communities of California

Ecoregions of California
interior

Forests of California
Forests of the Sierra Nevada (United States)
Sclerophyll forests